This is an incomplete list of Charles Sturt University people, including alumni and staff.

Alumni

Government

Politicians

Civil servants
 Robert Atkinson, former Queensland police commissioner 
 Ken Moroney, former New South Wales police commissioner

Humanities

Arts

History
 James Page, educationalist and anthropologist

Journalism and media

Literature, writing and poetry
Amanda Howard, true crime writer and serial killer specialist
Michaeley O'Brien, screenwriter
 Charlotte Wood

Philosophy and theology
 Jeffrey Driver, Anglican Archbishop of Adelaide 
 James Haire, theologian

Law
 Hon. Justice Carolyn Chalmers Simpson, Judge of the Supreme Court of New South Wales

Science
 Anika Molesworth, agroecology scientist
 Meredith Mitchell, agronomist

Sport

 Ellie Brush, soccer player 
 Caitlin De Wit, wheelchair basketball player
 Ben Fixter, AFL footballer 
 Stuart Karppinen, cricketer
 Ross Reynolds, Australian Rugby Union Wallaby
 Dean Windsor, professional cyclist

Other
 Afu Billy – Solomon Islands women's rights activist
Blandina Khondowe – Miss Malawi 2002, breast-cancer awareness activist
 Craig Steven Wright – Australian computer scientist and businessman associated with cryptocurrency

Administration

Chancellors

Vice-Chancellors

Faculty
Notable past and current faculty members include:

 Tara Brabazon, education academic 
 Les Bursill, indigenous historian, archaeologist and anthropologist 
 David Denholm, author, historian
 Jeffrey Driver, Anglican Archbishop of Adelaide 
 Clive Hamilton, public intellectual and ethicist 
 Elery Hamilton-Smith, environmental scholar and academic
 Tom Lowrie, education academic 
 Hugh Mackay, social researcher 
 Benjamin Myers, theologian 
 Faye McMillan, Indigenous health academic
 John Painter, theologian 
 Thomas Pogge, philosopher
 Anantanarayanan Raman, Professor of Ecology
 Steve Redhead, sports media academic 
 Emma Rush, philosopher and ethicist
 Dirk Spennemann, cultural heritage academic
 John Weckert, philosopher
 John Williams, hydrology scientist

References

Charles Sturt University
Charles Sturt University people